Legal and Criminological Psychology is a quarterly academic journal published by the British Psychological Society. The journal was established in 1996. In 2018, it had an ISI impact factor of 1.764, ranking it 23 out of 65 in Criminology and Penology, 33 out of 148 in Law and 51 out of 137 in Multidisciplinary Psychology.

It is abstracted and indexed by:

 Academic Search Alumni Edition
 Criminal Justice Abstracts
 Embase
 ProQuest Central
 PsycINFO
 SCOPUS
 Social Sciences Citation Index
 SocINDEX
 Web of Science

References

External links
Official site

Criminology
Criminology journals
Forensic psychology journals
British Psychological Society academic journals